The People's Committee of Siam, ( was the first constitutional Cabinet of Siam (now Thailand) or (. After the Revolution of 1932, and promulgation of the 'Temporary' Constitution, Phraya Manopakorn Nititada (a civil servant and former Minister of Justice) was appointed the first President of the People's Committee ( - in essence Prime Minister. However he was not allowed to appoint the members of the Cabinet as the Khana Ratsadon, the revolutionary party, has already decided to do that themselves.

Out of the fifteen members 10 are from the Khana Ratsadon; out of the 7 "Promoters" 5 are in the committee. The committee did not present any policies to the National Assembly, but decided to govern the country in accordance with the 6 Principles. The committee was active from 28 June 1932 to 10 December 1932. The committee ended with the signing and promulgation of the 'Permanent' Constitution of 1932, most members returned for the second Cabinet.

See also
Siamese Revolution of 1932
Khana Ratsadon
Constitution of Thailand
Cabinet of Thailand
Government of Thailand
History of Thailand (1932–1973)

References

Political history of Thailand
1932 establishments in Siam
1932 disestablishments
Cabinets of Thailand